Jackson Township is a township in Greene County, Pennsylvania, United States. The population was 379 at the 2020 census.

History
The Richard T. Foley Site, William Cree House, Hughes House, and John Rex Farm are listed on the National Register of Historic Places.

Geography
Jackson Township is in western Greene County. Unincorporated communities in the township include Nettle Hill, Buzz, Bluff, White Cottage, Delphene, and Woodruff.

Demographics

As of the census of 2000, there were 516 people, 192 households, and 145 families residing in the township.  The population density was 17.5 people per square mile (6.8/km).  There were 228 housing units at an average density of 7.7/sq mi (3.0/km).  The racial makeup of the township was 98.84% White, 0.19% Pacific Islander, and 0.97% from two or more races.

There were 192 households, out of which 34.4% had children under the age of 18 living with them, 62.0% were married couples living together, 8.3% had a female householder with no husband present, and 24.0% were non-families. 20.3% of all households were made up of individuals, and 8.3% had someone living alone who was 65 years of age or older.  The average household size was 2.69 and the average family size was 3.09.

In the township the population was spread out, with 25.4% under the age of 18, 9.5% from 18 to 24, 23.3% from 25 to 44, 28.5% from 45 to 64, and 13.4% who were 65 years of age or older.  The median age was 39 years. For every 100 females, there were 101.6 males.  For every 100 females age 18 and over, there were 102.6 males.

The median income for a household in the township was $32,188, and the median income for a family was $37,500. Males had a median income of $35,000 versus $20,625 for females. The per capita income for the township was $12,653.  About 15.1% of families and 22.9% of the population were below the poverty line, including 32.0% of those under age 18 and 23.9% of those age 65 or over.

References

Townships in Greene County, Pennsylvania
Townships in Pennsylvania